Edward Marriott is a British psychotherapist and author. Marriott is a member of the clinic staff of the Institute of Psychoanalysis.

His first book, The Lost Tribe, was shortlisted for the Thomas Cook Travel Book Award.

Works
 The Lost Tribe: A Harrowing Passage into New Guinea's Heart of Darkness (1996) Holt Paperbacks, 
 Savage Shore: Life and Death with Nicaragua's Last Shark Hunters (2000) Holt Paperbacks, 
 The Plague Race (2002) Pan MacMillan, 
 Claude and Madeleine: A True Story of War, Espionage and Passion (2005) Picador USA

References

Living people
British writers
Alumni of Durham University
British psychotherapists
Year of birth missing (living people)